Melissa Chen (born 1985) is a Singaporean journalist and activist. She is a contributing editor for Spectator USA and co-founder of Ideas Beyond Borders. She resides in the United States.

Biography
Chen was born in Singapore. She was raised in a conservative household. Chen emigrated to the United States at 17, living in Boston. She studied at Boston University. She later became a journalist. Chen has stated her decision to reside in the United States is due to the country's freedom of the press and ideas.

Chen rose to prominence when she became a strong advocate for Amos Yee, a Singaporean student who had been arrested and imprisoned for publishing materials (depicting Singapore's founding father Lee Kuan Yew in a negative way, and also criticizing Christianity and Islam) that the government of Singapore considered to be insulting. Chen assisted Yee when the latter fled to the United States and claimed political asylum. Yee severed ties with Chen in 2017. Chen later called for Yee to be deported after he expressed pro-pedophilia opinions and created pro-pedophilia content.

In 2017 Chen co-founded Ideas Beyond Borders with Faisal Saeed Al Mutar, an Iraqi advocate for free speech. The foundation focuses on translating works written in English into Arabic; most of the translated works are books that are considered controversial (often to the point of being de facto or de jure banned) in the Arabic world, such as George Orwell's Nineteen Eighty-Four and works by Thomas Paine. Chen serves as the organization's managing director.

Views
Chen is a critic of China's human rights record, curtailing of free speech, and foreign policy. She is also a critic of her native Singapore's restrictions on free speech.

During the COVID-19 pandemic, Chen called for the closing of Chinese wet markets. An article Chen authored for The Spectator USA about the need to close Chinese wet markets was criticized in Singapore for using an image of a Singaporean wet market, though Chen later clarified the image used was chosen by an editor and not herself and her article did not criticize wet markets in Singapore.

References

External links
 Spectator profile

1985 births
Living people
Boston University alumni
Free speech activists
Human rights activists
Singaporean emigrants to the United States
Singaporean women activists
Singaporean women journalists